Clausinella is a genus of marine bivalve mollusc in the family Veneridae.

Fossil record
Fossils of Clausinella are found in marine strata from the Eocene to the Quaternary (age range: from 48.6 to 0 million years ago). Fossils are known from many localities in Europe, Argentina, Brazil, Morocco, Yemen, Australia, India and Indonesia.

Species
Species within this genus include: 
 Clausinella fasciata da Costa, 1778
 Clausinella punctigera (Dautzenberg & H. Fischer, 1906)
 †Clausinella scalaris (H.G. Bronn, 1831)

Species Clausinella gayi L.-H. Hupé, 1854 has been designated a synonym of Tawera elliptica (Lamarck, 1818)

References

Veneridae
Bivalve genera